is a railway station in the city of Kiyosu, Aichi Prefecture,  Japan, operated by Meitetsu.

Lines

Station layout
The station has two unnumbered side platforms on passing loops, connected by an underground passage. The station has automated ticket machines, Manaca automated turnstiles and is unattended.

Platforms

Adjacent stations

Station history
Futatsu-iri Station was opened on February 1, 1942.  The station was rebuilt in November 1984, and became unattended from March 2004.

Passenger statistics
In fiscal 2013, the station was used by an average of 2708 passengers daily.

Surrounding area
 Mitsubishi Heavy Industries Kiyosu plant
Meiji Chewing Gum

See also
 List of Railway Stations in Japan

References

External links

 Official web page 

Railway stations in Japan opened in 1942
Railway stations in Aichi Prefecture
Stations of Nagoya Railroad
Kiyosu, Aichi